The canton of Valdoie is an administrative division of the Territoire de Belfort department, northeastern France. Its borders were modified at the French canton reorganisation which came into effect in March 2015. Its seat is in Valdoie.

It consists of the following communes:

Denney 
Éloie
Évette-Salbert
Offemont
Roppe
Sermamagny
Valdoie
Vétrigne

References

Cantons of the Territoire de Belfort